Blue Cloud Abbey was an American Benedictine monastery located near the town of Marvin, in Grant County, South Dakota. It was a member of the Swiss-American Congregation. The patron saint of the monastery was the Blessed Virgin Mary under the title of Our Lady of the Snows, from which the abbey derived its name.

History
During the first half of the 20th century, the monks of St. Meinrad Archabbey in Indiana had operated four small mission churches in the Dakotas, two in North Dakota and two in South Dakota. Their purpose was to serve the local population of the region, primarily the Native Americans on the Indian reservations, for whom they also operated several schools. In 1949 the monastic chapter decided to establish a new monastery to establish their presence more stably in that region and thereby to permit the full expression of their monastic lives.

To this end, Archabbot Ignatius Esser, O.S.B., assigned four monks to scout the area. While driving to look at one site, they stopped outside the tiny town of Marvin and saw a rolling, wooded string of hills above Whetstone Valley. The land was rocky but they liked it so they went to nearby Milbank to inquire about its availability. They were directed to the local bank, where the president of the bank, Effner Benedict, told them that the land had just been listed for sale 30 minutes earlier. He offered them  at $22 an acre. These Benedictines felt that the good timing, combined with the banker's name, were signs which they could not ignore, so they immediately agreed to purchase the land.

Construction began that same year, with the monastic buildings being designed by the Chicago architect Edo Belli. The monastery was formally established on June 24, 1950, as a dependency of St. Meinrad Archabbey. It was raised to the rank of a semi-independent priory on 5 August 1952 and to a fully autonomous abbey on 21 March 1954, with Gilbert Hess, O.S.B., being elected as the community's first abbot. At its peak, there were forty monks in the community.

It was during the administration of the second abbot, Alan Berndt, O.S.B. (1920–2016), that the abbey reached its highest membership, and carried on a variety of services. He was instrumental in the transferring the ownership and administration of the abbey's mission schools to the Native people they served.

Daughter house
In 1964, in response to a call made by Pope John XXIII to the Catholic Church in North America to assist their fellow Catholics in Latin America, the abbey established a new foundation, the Priory of the Resurrection, in Cobán, Guatemala. This small community of monks remained a dependency of Blue Cloud Abbey until the abbey's closing, when it was transferred to the authority of St. Meinrad Archabbey.

Closure

On 29 May 2012 the monks of Blue Cloud Abbey voted to close the monastery. The reason for closure was that the monastery had not been able to draw a sufficient number of new members, which led to an increasingly aging monastic community. After a final Mass on Sunday, 5 August 2012—the feast day of Our Lady of the Snows, the patroness of the abbey—it officially ceased operations, and all public liturgies and scheduled retreats were cancelled.

Denis Quinkert, O.S.B., was Blue Cloud Abbey's last abbot. The 14 remaining monks of the community, almost all of whom were above the age of 70, dispersed to other monasteries.

Current status
While the abbey has not yet been legally dissolved, in December 2013, a Catholic nonprofit organization has taken ownership of the abbey property. It is now operated as the Abbey of the Hills Inn and Retreat Center and includes two hermitages.

Abbots
Gilbert Hess, O.S.B. (1954–1970)
Alan Berndt, O.S.B. (1970–1986)
Denis Quinkert, O.S.B. (1986–1991)
Thomas Hillebrand, O.S.B. (1992–2009)
Denis Quinkert, O.S.B.(2009–2012)

References

External links
Abbey of the Hills

Benedictine monasteries in the United States
Christian organizations established in 1950
Catholic Church in South Dakota
1950 establishments in South Dakota
2012 disestablishments in South Dakota
Religious organizations disestablished in 2012